The Asian Physics Olympiad (APhO) is an annual physics competition for high school students from Asia and Oceania regions. It is one of the International Science Olympiads. It was initiated in the year of 2000 by Indonesia. The first APhO was hosted by Indonesia in 2000.

APhO has its origins in the International Physics Olympiad and is conducted according to similar statutes (One five-hour theoretical examination and one or two laboratory examinations). It is usually held about two months before the IPhO and can also be seen as additional training for the teams.

Each national delegation is made up of eight competitors (unlike five in the IPhO) plus two leaders. Observers may also accompany a national team. The leaders are involved in the selection, preparation and translation of the exam tasks, and the translation and marking of exam papers. The students compete as individuals, and must sit through intensive theoretical and laboratory examinations. For their efforts the students can be awarded a medal (gold, silver or bronze) or an honorable mention.

History 
In 1999, the team leader of Indonesia, Prof. Yohanes Surya, Ph.D., together with the president of IPhO, Prof.Waldemar Gorzkowski, undertook to create and organize the first APhO, which was held in Indonesia, between April 24 and May 2, 2000. At this time, prof. Gorzkowski was also working in Indonesia to help with the IPhO team. The event attracted participants from 12 Asian countries. It now is attended by up to 27 countries.

Actively participating countries include Australia, Azerbaijan, Bangladesh, Cambodia, China, Hong Kong, India, Indonesia, Israel, Kazakhstan, Kyrgyzstan, Macau, Malaysia, Mongolia, Nepal, Saudi Arabia, Singapore, Sri Lanka, Taiwan, Tajikistan, Thailand, and Vietnam. Russia and Romania have participated as guest teams in the past years.

Differences between APhO and IPhO 
APhO has 8 students in each delegation, while IPhO has 5.

The award system 
In 2001, the IPhO International Board accepted a new system of awarding the prizes. The new system, designed by Cyril Isenberg and Dr. Gunter Lind was based on relative number of contestants for each type of award, instead of the score boundaries defined by percentage of the best contestant's score.

This was not acceptable for APhO, because the average level of contestants is different. The old system remained in power for APhO since the beginning up to 9th APhO in Mongolia, where the leaders voted for replacing it by a new award system suggested by Dr. Eli Raz from the Israeli delegation. The new system, sometimes unofficially referred to as the Israeli Award System, is based on a reference score that is the lowest between twice the median score and the mean score of the top 3 participants. It was first used on 10th APhO in Thailand.

Summary
Dates and locations of the APhO:

See also 
 International Physics Olympiad

References

External links 
Website of the 2022 APhO
Website of the 2021 APhO
Website of the 2019 APhO
Website of the 2018 APhO
Website of the 2017 APhO
Website of the 2016 APhO
Website of the 2015 APhO 
Website of the 2014 APhO
Website of the 2013 APhO
Website of the 2012 APhO
Website of the 2011 APhO
Website of the 2010 APhO
Website of the 2009 APhO
Website of the 2008 APhO
Website of the 2007 APhO
Website of the 2003 APhO
Official website of the Asian Physics Olympiad
Statutes of the Asian Physics Olympiad
Homepage of the International Physics Olympiad
Homi Bhabha Centre for Science Education - Conducts Mathematics and Science Olympiads for High school students in India Region
Iranian Physics Olympiads (IranPhO)

Student quiz competitions
Youth science
Physics competitions
Annual events in Asia